First Love of a Royal Prince (also known as A Prince's First Love) is a 2004 South Korean television series starring Sung Yu-ri, Cha Tae-hyun, Kim Nam-jin and Jin Jae-young. It aired on MBC from June 23 to August 26, 2004 on Wednesdays and Thursdays at 21:55 for 18 episodes.

Plot
Kim Yu-bin (Sung Yu-ri) is a fun-loving, affable sandwich shop delivery girl who has been harboring a crush on the recipient of her first delivery, Cha Seung-hyun (Kim Nam-jin). Seung-hyun, a well pedigreed and recognized manager of Any Electronics, stands in stark contrast to Choi Gun-hee (Cha Tae-hyun), a spoiled heir skipping out on school in the United States unbeknownst to his father.

Yu-bin wins a trip to a ski resort in Japan and decides to visit her friend Shin Ye-seo (Jennie Lee) who works as a guide there, one of several owned by Gun-hee's father. That weekend, Gun-hee sneaks off to the same resort to celebrate his birthday with friends and latest fling, Lee Hae-mi (Jin Jae-young), an actress and rising star. Gun-hee's father's unexpected visit to Japan forces Gun-hee to jump into Yu-bin's cab without his wallet which leads to a full day together for this already contentious pair.

After an unsuccessful stint as secretary for Seung-hyun, Yu-bin finally gets to work her dream job as a tour guide in Bali, only it's alongside her unwanted acquaintance, Gun-hee. When Seung-hyun and Hae-mi travel there to shoot a commercial for a new Any Electronics product launch, strong feelings of attachment and rivalry surface. Meanwhile, a 30-year-old but unforgotten past between Gun-hee's father and Seung-hyun's mother complicates matters.

Cast
 Sung Yu-ri as Kim Yu-bin 
 Cha Tae-hyun as Choi Gun-hee 
 Kim Nam-jin as Cha Seung-hyun 
 Jin Jae-young as Lee Hae-mi, Gun-hee's girlfriend
 Jennie Lee as Shin Ye-seo, Yu-bin's friend
 Lee Deok-hwa as President Choi Eun-chul
 Chang Mi-hee as Cha Mi-hee, Seung-hyun's mother
 Kim Young-joon as Jin-ho, Gun-hee's friend
 Kwon Ki-sun as Yu-bin's mother
 Kim Chang-wan as Yu-bin's father
 Lee Ki-young as Kang Ji-hoon/Kevin
 Yoo Chae-yeong as Han Sarah
 Song Jong-ho as Yoon-joon
 Jeong Jun-ha as Jung Gwang-pil
 Jeon Hye-bin
 Jin Ji-hee
 Seo Il-hyun

International broadcast
 It aired in Vietnam on HTV9 from December 13, 2004.

References

External links
 First Love of a Royal Prince official MBC website 
 First Love of a Royal Prince at MBC Global Media
 
 

2004 South Korean television series debuts
2004 South Korean television series endings
MBC TV television dramas
Korean-language television shows
South Korean romantic comedy television series